Mysidopsis is a genus of mysid shrimps in the family Mysidae. The sensitivity of these shrimps to water quality makes them suitable for bioassays. Mysidopsis bahia and Mysidopsis almyra, which are used frequently to test for pesticides and other toxic substances, are now classified as Americamysis bahia and Americamysis almyra.

Species
The World Register of Marine Species lists the following species:

Mysidopsis acuta Hansen, 1913
Mysidopsis angusta G.O. Sars, 1864
Mysidopsis ankeli Brattegard, 1973
Mysidopsis arenosa Brattegard, 1974
Mysidopsis badius Modlin, 1987
Mysidopsis bispinosa O. Tattersall, 1969
Mysidopsis bispinulata Brattegard, 1974
Mysidopsis brattegarti Bacescu & Gleye, 1979
Mysidopsis brattstroemi Brattegard, 1969
Mysidopsis buffaloensis Wooldridge, 1988
Mysidopsis cachuchoensis San Vicente, Frutos & Sorbe, 2012
Mysidopsis californica W. Tattersall, 1932
Mysidopsis camelina O. Tattersall, 1955
Mysidopsis cathengelae Gleye, 1982
Mysidopsis coelhoi Bacescu, 1968
Mysidopsis coralicola Bacescu, 1975
Mysidopsis cultrata Brattegard, 1973
Mysidopsis didelphys (Norman, 1863)
Mysidopsis eclipes Brattegard, 1969
Mysidopsis eremita O. Tattersall, 1962
Mysidopsis furca Bowman, 1957
Mysidopsis gibbosa G.O. Sars, 1864
Mysidopsis hellvillensis Nouvel, 1964
Mysidopsis iluroensis San Vicente, 2013
Mysidopsis indica W. Tattersall, 1922
Mysidopsis intii Holmquist, 1957
Mysidopsis japonica Ii, 1964
Mysidopsis juniae da Silva, 1979
Mysidopsis kempi W. Tattersall, 1922
Mysidopsis kenyana Bacescu & Vasilescu, 1973
Mysidopsis lata Bravo & Murano, 1996
Mysidopsis major (Zimmer, 1928)
Mysidopsis mathewsoni Brattegard, 1969
Mysidopsis mauchlinei Brattegard, 1974
Mysidopsis mortenseni W. Tattersall, 1951
Mysidopsis oligocenicus De Angeli & Rossi, 2006
Mysidopsis onofrensis Bacescu & Gleye, 1979
Mysidopsis rionegrensis Hoffmeyer, 1993
Mysidopsis robusta Brattegard, 1974
Mysidopsis robustispina Brattegard, 1969
Mysidopsis sankarankuttyi Bacescu, 1984
Mysidopsis schultzei (Zimmer, 1928)
Mysidopsis scintilae dos Reis & da Silva, 1987
Mysidopsis similis (Zimmer, 1912)
Mysidopsis suedafrikana O. Tattersall, 1969
Mysidopsis surugae Murano, 1970
Mysidopsis tortonesei Bacescu, 1968
Mysidopsis velifera Brattegard, 1973
Mysidopsis virgulata Brattegard, 1974

References

Mysida
Crustacean genera
Taxa named by Georg Ossian Sars